AJ Swann is an American football quarterback for the Vanderbilt Commodores.

High school career 
Swann attended Cherokee High School in Canton, Georgia. A 3 star prospect according to 247Sports, he was ranked the nations 23rd overall quarterback recruit. Originally committed to Maryland, Swann flipped his commitment and decided to play college football at Vanderbilt.

College career 
As a true freshman, Swann would make his first career start against Northern Illinois, and would throw four touchdowns in a comeback win. For his performance against Northern Illinois, Swann was named the SEC freshman of the week. In his first career SEC start, Swann would throw for 125 yards in a blowout loss to #2 ranked Alabama.

References

External links
Vanderbilt Commodores Bio

American football quarterbacks
Living people
Vanderbilt Commodores football players
Year of birth missing (living people)